The County Chairman is a 1903 comedy play by George Ade, which was one of his greatest successes.  Produced by Henry W. Savage, it played for 222 performances on Broadway at Wallack's Theatre. It was also adapted to film in 1914 and 1935.

Play

The County Chairman was Ade's first attempt at non-musical comedy.  The play was first performed at the Auditorium in South Bend, Indiana, on August 29, 1903, and also played for a number of weeks at the Studebaker Theatre in Chicago. It opened on Broadway on Tuesday, November 24, 1903, and played for 222 performances.  The reviews of the play were also positive.  Maclyn Arbuckle, playing the local politician Jim Hackler, starred both on Broadway and on the road, playing the role for four years.  Reviewers also praised Willis P. Sweatnam's blackface role.  Sweatnam was an old minstrel performer who Ade worked into the play after finding he had fallen on hard times.  (Black actor Stepin Fetchit played the former blackface role in the 1935 film.)

The play closed for the season at Wallack's on June 4, 1904, but returned for 44 more performances in the fall before going on the road.   It was also revived in 1936 for eight performances at the National Theatre, with Charles Coburn playing Hackler, but did not draw large audiences.

Ade later recounted that he took the names of many of play's characters from a list of tax delinquents posted in the courthouse of Vicksburg, Mississippi, a "grand roster of good old Anglo-Saxon names" which fit the "undiluted American 'types' to be found in Antioch", the location of the play.

The County Chairman was included in Burns Mantle's Best Plays of 1899-1909 volume published in 1944.

A study of Ade's work published in 1964 concluded that The County Chairman had been "largely ignored in histories of American drama," despite being "the worthiest of Ade's plays."

Original Broadway cast
 
 The Honorable Jim Hackler ... Maclyn Arbuckle
 Tillford Wheeler ... Earle Browne
 Elias Rigby ... Charles Fisher
 Riley Cleaver ... Fred Bock
 Wilson Prewitt ... Harry Holman
 Jupiter Pettaway ... George Ricketts
 Sassafras Livingston ... Willis P. Sweatnam
 Jefferson Briscoe ... Edward Chapman
 Uncle Eck Millbury ... W.J. Gross
 Vance Jimmison ... J. Sydney Macy
 Joe Whittaker ... E.R. Phillips
 Cal Barcus ... Claude C. Boyer
 "Chub" Tolliver ... Fred Santley
 Amos Whitney ... Roy Richards
 Clabe Overton ... Howard Cuyler
 Dawson Montgomery ... John J. Meehan
 Lucy Rigby ... Miriam Nesbitt
 Mrs. Elias Rigby ... Christine Blessing
 Mrs. Jefferson Briscoe ... Rose Beaudet
 Lorena Watkins ... Grace Fisher
 "Chick" Elzey ... Anna Buckley
 Tilly .... Nina Ainscoe

Adaptations

The play first adapted to a film of the same name in 1914, with Arbuckle and Sweatnam returning to their original roles.  It was again adapted to film in 1935.

References

External links

1903 plays
American plays adapted into films
Broadway plays
Plays set in the 19th century